Reimell Tagenath Ragnauth (born 29 March 1975) is an English former first-class cricketer.

Ragnauth was born in March 1975 at Cambridge, where he was educated at The Perse School, before going up to Trinity Hall, Cambridge. While studying at Cambridge, he made his debut in first-class cricket for Cambridge University against Yorkshire at Fenner's in 1995. He played thirteen further first-class matches for Cambridge, the last coming in 1996 against Essex. In his fourteen first-class appearances for Cambridge, Ragnauth scored 456 runs at an average of 18.24, with a high score of 82. In addition to playing first-class cricket, he also played minor counties cricket for Cambridgeshire in 1995 and 1996, making three appearances in the Minor Counties Championship.

References

External links

1975 births
Living people
Sportspeople from Cambridge
Free Foresters cricketers
People educated at The Perse School
Alumni of Trinity Hall, Cambridge
English cricketers
Cambridge University cricketers
Cambridgeshire cricketers